The Gault Center, formerly the National Juvenile Defender Center or NJDC, is a nonprofit organization located in the United States that advocates for juvenile justice reform. NJDC changed names to The Gault Center in 2022.

History
The American Bar Association Juvenile Justice Center eventually grew into the National Juvenile Defender Center. In 2005, Patricia Puritz founded NJDC as a standalone organization. In May 2015, Kim Dvorchak succeeded Puritz as the executive director of NJDC.

NJDC has advocated against the shackling of juveniles during court appearances and provides training for attorneys working with juveniles.

Throughout the COVID-19 pandemic, the NJDC argued for the release of detained juveniles for safety reasons.

See also
 American juvenile justice system
 Juvenile court
 Juvenile delinquency in the United States
 Kids for cash scandal
 Prison-industrial complex
 School-to-prison pipeline
 Trial as an adult in the United States
Youth incarceration in the United States

References

Legal advocacy organizations in the United States
Political advocacy groups in the United States
Criminal justice reform in the United States
Criminal defense organizations